In Venezuela, since the opening of the Teatro Caracas and, earlier, the Teatro Maderero (then called Teatro de la Zarzuela), there has been a great lyrical tradition ranging from serious opera to operetta, zarzuela, and Spanish musical reviews.

History
The first Venezuelan opera was El maestro Rufo Zapatero an opera buffa composed in 1848 by José María Osorio. Virginia by José Ángel Montero (sometimes incorrectly called the first Venezuelan opera) debuted in 1877, under the auspices of Antonio Guzmán Blanco. Another major early Venezuelan opera composer was Reynaldo Hahn, who was greatly influenced by his teacher Jules Massenet. He greatly expanded the genre of French operetta, of which Ciboulette was his most famous work; he also composed operas as Le Merchand de Venise.

Before the foregoing had occurred, José María Osorio had composed early zarzuelas. The first Venezuelan zarzuela to debut, however, was José Ángel Montero's Los alemanes en Italia, in the 1860s. Montero also debuted the zarzuelas El Cumpleaños de Leonor, El Charlatán Mudo, La Modista, and many others. Another major zarzuela composer was Pedro Elías Gutiérrez, who used Venezuelan rhythms. His most important work was perhaps Alma Llanera, with lyrics by Rafael Bolívar Coronado.

In the 20th century, Caracas had a rich cultural tradition. Teatro Maderero, Teatro Caracas, and the more modern Teatro Nacional and Teatro Municipal competed for the public's attention. The Teatro Maderero and Teatro Caracas, after the construction of the latter two, played a secondary role and were nearly always used for popular musical acts, such as reviews and fandango. The Teatro Nacional was the theater for the country's finest zarzuela, while the Municipal typically staged Italian, German and French works, which were more serious. Today Venezuelan operas are typically held in the Teatro Teresa Carreño.

Contemporary Venezuelan opera composers include María Luisa Escobar, whose works include Kanaime, Orquídeas Azules, and Princesa Girasol. Other important composers are Hector Pellegatti (author of the verismo opera El Negro Miguel with lyrics by Pedro Blanco Vilariño), Alexis Rago (author of El Páramo, Miranda, and Froilán el Infausto), Eric Colon (author of  El Caballero de Ledesma), Federico Ruíz (author of the famous opera buffa , with a libretto by Aquiles Nazoa).

Venezuelan-American composer Sylvia Constantinidis who has written music and libretto for several lyrical works: two dramatic contemporary operas, Araminta and Afrodita; one experimental short opera, Aurora; and three children operas, Lincoln, Ponce de Leon, and The First ThanksGiving. Some scenes from Araminta were premiered in concert in England 2017. Afrodita was premiered in concert in England 2015 and in Miami, USA, also in 2015. Aurora, the experimental short opera, was premiered in England in 2011. The three children operas: Lincoln, Ponce de Leon, and The First ThanksGiving, were all premiered in Florida, USA, in 2001, 2002, and 2003. For these three children operas Constantinidis received the Educator of Note Award 2003 by the Ethel and W. George Kennedy Family Foundation, and the Young Patronesses of the Opera, the Florida Grand Opera.

Venezuelan lyric singers

Venezuelan conductors
Atanasio Bello Montero, Ángel Sauce, Gustavo Dudamel, Primo Casale, Angelo Pagliucca, Eduardo Marturet, Eduardo Rahn, Cesar Ivan Lara, Rafael Payare, Rodolfo Saglimbeni, Teresa Carreño, .

See also
Opera in Latin America

References

Venezuela
Venezuelan music